Damini is a 1993 Indian Hindi-language crime drama film directed and co-written by Rajkumar Santoshi. It stars Meenakshi Seshadri in the titular role with Sunny Deol, Rishi Kapoor and Amrish Puri. Aamir Khan makes a special appearance. The story revolves around Damini who witnesses her housemaid being raped by her brother-in-law and his friends. Despite facing many obstacles, she strives to get justice for her with the help of her husband and Govind, a lawyer. The film is considered to be one of the best woman-centric films ever made in Bollywood.

Besides being critically acclaimed, the film also became the sixth highest grossing of the year and was declared a "hit" at Box Office India. Damini – Lightning is mostly remembered for Meenakshi Seshadri's career best performance that was highly acclaimed.

It is considered a cult feminist film and is still regarded as an all-time classic female oriented film and important for portraying women empowerment in cinema The pathbreaking film was praised for breaking social taboos and handling the subject of rape with sensitivity; a rarity in Bollywood at the time.

It is equally memorable for Sunny Deol's brilliant portrayal of an alcoholic lawyer and the role gained him a Filmfare as well as National Film Award for Best Supporting Actor for 1993. It strengthened his Bollywood he-man image. His dialogues in the film "Tarikh Pe Tarikh" ("date after date") and "Dhai Kilo ka Haath" ('Two-and-a-half kilogram hand') became iconic and a pop-culture reference. The film was a milestone in the careers of Sunny Deol, Meenakshi Sheshadri and Amrish Puri, who gave some great hits like Ghayal (1990) and Ghatak: Lethal (1996) together. Aamir Khan acted in a special appearance in the stage show dance song. He also promotes his upcoming film Andaz Apna Apna (1994) which was also directed by Rajkumar Santoshi.

Damini is the recipient of a number of accolades. At the 40th National Film Awards, Deol won Best Supporting Actor. In addition to other awards, the film received seven nominations at the 39th Filmfare Awards including Best Film, Best Actress for Seshadri, and Best Villain for Puri. It won a 4 leading awards — Best Director for Santoshi, Best Supporting Actor for Deol, Best Story for Sutanu Gupta, and Best Sound for Rakesh Ranjan.

Plot
Shekhar Gupta (Rishi Kapoor), a rich businessman, falls in love at first sight with Damini (Meenakshi Seshadri). They get married and Damini moves into his luxurious bungalow. On Holi day, she witnesses Shekhar's younger brother, Rakesh (Ashwin Kaushal), and his friends, gangraping the maid-servant Urmi (Prajakta) and rushes to tell Shekhar. Shekhar rushes over to prevent sexual assault but is too late. The Gupta family conspires to cover up this shameful incident. But Damini decides to inform the police. The matter is taken up in court and Damini is asked to testify. Damini is portrayed as a mentally unstable person and confined in a mental institution for two weeks by judicial order. Unable to bear the mental torture in the institution, she escapes and runs into a down-and-out alcoholic lawyer, Govind (Sunny Deol), who has the rape case re-opened. Urmi dies in hospital and the police write her death off as a suicide. But Govind is able to prove otherwise. It is up to Damini, Govind and Shekhar to provide justice to the victimized girl.

Cast
Rishi Kapoor as Shekhar Gupta
Meenakshi Seshadri as Damini Gupta
Sunny Deol as Advocate Govind Srivastava
Amrish Puri as Barrister Indrajit Chaddha
Kulbhushan Kharbanda as Kedarnath Gupta, Damini's father-in-law & Shekhar's father.
Anjan Srivastav as Chandrakant, Damini's father
Paresh Rawal as Tolu Bajaj
Rohini Hattangadi as Sumitra Gupta, Damini's mother-in-law & Shekhar's mother.
Tinnu Anand as Shekhar's maternal uncle
Sulabha Arya as Shekhar's maternal aunt
Achyut Potdar as Police Commissioner
Vijayendra Ghatge as Inspector Kadam
K.K. Raina as Shekhar's friend
Virendra Saxena as Advocate Saxena, First Lawyer of Damini and Public Prosecutor.
Viju Khote as Shekhar's Driver
Madhav Moghe as Birju , Mimicry artist , Damini's brother-in-law.
Ashwin Kaushal as Rakesh Gupta, Damini's brother-in-law & Shekhar's brother.
Prajakta Kulkarni as Urmi
Suhas Bhalekar as Urmi's grandfather (guest appearance)
Aamir Khan as himself Dancer in a song with Damini. (special appearance)

Soundtrack 

The soundtrack of this movie was composed by the music duo Nadeem Shravan and the lyrics were penned by Sameer . The soundtrack was released in 1993 on Audio Cassette and Audio CD in RPG-HMV Music Made in India and EMI Made in England, Which consist 5 Songs. The full album is recorded by Kumar Sanu, Alka Yagnik, and Sadhna Sargam

The lyrics were written The song "Gawah Hain Chand Taare Gawah Hai" is based on the Swahili folk song "Malaika".

Critical reception
Pranay Bhagat wrote: "If there is one modern film which signifies the importance of truth it has to be Damini. Though the movie is more remembered for the dialogues of Sunny Deol and his confrontational scenes with Amrish Puri, I feel the movie should also be appreciated for a tight bound script, the wonderfully directed courtroom scenes, good background music as well as a career best performance from Meenakshi."

Vineeta Sinha in her review praises the film for its tight bound script, courtroom scenes, music and above all the career best performance of Meenakshi.

Sulagana Biswas of Telegraph India; states the film despite being dated is still "eminently watchable" and also praising Sheshadri's portrayal of the title role states "the film still holds its own due to the earnestness of Meenakshi Sheshadri's performance". Simantini Dey writing for News18 hails the film as a "cult feminist film" and states "Damini -- released in 1993 -- is perhaps one of the most misunderstood films in Bollywood history. Despite receiving instant critical acclaim upon its release and having a successful run at the box-office, we as an audience have celebrated this film for all the wrong reasons. Yes, Sunny Deol's punchy dialogues like, "Tarikh par Tarikh milti rahi hai, lekin insaaf nahi mila, my lord!" deserved all the claps and whistles it received, and the theatrics of the courtroom drama, wherein two lawyers Govind (Sunny Deol) and Mr. Indrajit Chaddha (Amrish Puri) exchange angry words and stares indeed make for a great Bollywood entertainer. But the real reason why Damini was such an iconic film and deserves a cult status is the protagonist of the film --- Damini (played brilliantly by Meenakshi Seshadri). Till date, Bollywood has not given us such a strong and beautifully written female character as Damini, who not only has a mind of her own, but also a conscience. Long before films like Raazi and Pink were made in Bollywood, Rajkumar Santoshi's Damini gave us a HIT feminist movie with a female central character, who fights against all odds to bring justice to another woman."

Accolades

Remakes
Damini – Lightning was remade into Odia as Nari Nuhne Tu Narayani, starring Sidhanta Mohapatra and Rachana Banarjee,  in Tamil as Priyanka, starring Revathi as the title character, in Telugu as Urmila, starring Suman and Malashri, and in Bangladesh as Sottyer Bijoy, starring Manna and Moushumi, directed by F.I. Manik. Box Office India declared the film a super hit. The rights of the movie were owned by Shah Rukh Khan's Red Chillies Entertainment, which were transferred to Sunny Deol who plans to remake the film with his son Karan Deol.

References

External links

1993 films
1993 crime drama films
Films scored by Nadeem–Shravan
Films directed by Rajkumar Santoshi
Films featuring a Best Supporting Actor National Film Award-winning performance
Hindi films remade in other languages
1990s Hindi-language films
Indian crime drama films
Indian legal drama films
Indian courtroom films
Films about rape in India
1990s legal films
Indian avant-garde and experimental films